The Viña del Mar International Song Festival is an annual international music festival held every 3rd week of February in Viña del Mar, Chile. Started in 1960 it is the oldest and largest music festival in Latin America, and one of the longest running music festivals in the world.
It was cancelled in 2021 and 2022 due to the coronavirus pandemic.

The Festival takes place in the Quinta Vergara Amphitheater and attracts over 15,000 spectators. It has been broadcast live on radio and on Chilean television over the years by TVN, Canal 13, Megavisión or Chilevisión, regularly breaking viewing records. The Viña festival features a song competition in two categories: pop music and folk music, interspersed with performances by international music stars encompassing such diverse genres as rock, and pop music in various languages, cumbia, salsa, reggaetón, bachata among others.

History
Between 1984 and 1989 Leonardo Schultz and Gary H. Mason, one of the pioneers of the reggaeton movement, teamed up to help revamp the festival and streamline its operations. They arranged for the appearance of artists including: The Police, Air Supply, Eddie Money, Sheena Easton, Jose Feliciano (the pair produced his Grammy-nominated album Escenas de Amor in 1982, as well as the Grammy-winning album Me enamoré in 1983), Andy Gibb, Neil Sedaka, Gloria Gaynor, Mr. Mister to name a few. In 1988 and 1989, Thomas Anders (of Modern Talking fame) was the festival's headliner, one of the first times an artist was invited back to perform two years in a row.

Schultz and Mason also arranged for major international jurors including: George Martin (the Beatles' producer), Maurice Jarre (scored the films such as Dr. Zhivago, Lawrence of Arabia, Witness, A Passage To India, and Ghost), Manoella Torres (Mason produced her hit duet, which was written by Schultz entitled "No me mires así"), Joey Travolta, Connie Stevens and many others.

In the 1990s the broadcast rights to the Festival were given to Televisa and featured prominent Mexican Artists, as well as major Latin Artists.

In 2008, American rock music band Journey played their first concert with new vocalist Arnel Pineda at the festival. The 2008 Viña Festival was hosted by Sergio Lagos and Tonka Tomicic, and headlined by Nelly Furtado, Wisin & Yandel, and Earth, Wind & Fire.

In 2009, artists such as Latin sensation Daddy Yankee and the legendary British band Simply Red captivated the audience of Viña. For its 50th edition, the festival's hosts were the late Felipe Camiroaga and news reader Soledad Onetto.

The event has not been held in the years 2021 and 2022 due to the COVID-19 pandemic.

In March 2022, the return of the 62nd edition of the Viña del Mar International Song Festival was confirmed for the year 2023.

1970s and 1980s
Following the 1973 Chilean coup d'etat the dictatorship headed by Augusto Pinochet came to control the Viña del Mar International Song Festival and used it to promote sympathetic artists, in particular those that were part of the Acto de Chacarillas in 1977. 
In the first years of dictatorship Pinochet was a common guest at the festival. Pinochet's advisor Jaime Guzmán was also spotted on occasion at the festival. Festival presenter Antonio Vodanovic publicly praised the dictator and his wife Lucia Hiriart on one occasion on behalf of "the Chilean youth". Supporters of the dictatorship appropriated the song Libre of Nino Bravo, and this song was performed by Edmundo Arrocet in the first post-coup edition while Pinochet was present in the public.  From 1980 onward when the festival begun to be aired internationally the regime used it to promote a favourable image of Chile internationally. For that purpose in 1981 the festival spent a big budget on bringing popular foreign artist including Miguel Bosé, Julio Iglesias and Camilo Sesto. The folk music contest of the Viña del Mar International Song Festival had become increasingly politicized during the Allende years and was suspended by organizers from the time of the coup until 1980.

"El Monstruo"

Traditionally, the Festival's audience openly demonstrates its acceptance or displeasure with the established acts performing there, as well as contestants in the two competitions. As a result, the Chilean media has nicknamed the Festival's audience El Monstruo ("The Monster"). Earning acceptance from El Monstruo usually has a direct impact on an artist's popularity in the rest of Latin America. This is particularly true for Spanish speaking pop stars. Conversely, booing artists off the stage is not uncommon.

Artists compete in the Festival's regular competitions for one of three awards, given in this order: "Antorcha de Plata" (Silver Torch), "Antorcha de Oro" (Golden Torch) and "Gaviota de Plata" (Silver Seagull). However, audience response may demand that one of the three awards - or, progressively, all three- also be awarded to an established act as their performance progresses. An artist who "tames the "Monstruo"" by earning all three awards receives almost instant recognition as a major star by Chilean and Latin American media.

Awards' History 
Artists perform in the Festival de Viña with the goal of receiving as many awards as possible, which will depend on their success with "El Monstruo." The awards have had multiple changes throughout the festival's history. 

The first two awards ever given were the Golden Lyre and Golden Harp in 1961. However, these two awards would be replaced by the Silver and Golden Seagull in 1969.

In 1983, the Festival's commissioners decided to create the Silver and Golden Torch as a "second tier" award. This decision was made in order to add more variety to the awards, and make the Seagull the most prestigious award in the festival.

For over 30 years, no changes were made to the awards. However, in 2015,  the production team and Viña's municipality decided to eliminate the Silver and Golden Torch, leaving the Silver and Golden Seagull as the only awards that performers could aspire to get. The reason for this decision was all the critiques that the event was receiving about the high numbers of awards that an artist could receive.

Finally, the Platinum Seagull was added in 2012 as a special award for performers with long influence throughout the festival's history. Only 3 artists have received it up to date.

The Stage
Each year the TV companies try to improve on the previous year's set. Millions are invested in creating elaborate stages.

Winner songs

International contest
Before 1968, the contest only allowed Chilean composers.In 2000 the contest included the best songs in the history of the festival.In 2009, the contest included former winners between 2001 and 2008.In 2010 had a contest with the most representative songs of the participant countries.

Winning countries
 : 24 times (13 times in the International Contest + 9 when the Contest was only national)
 : 10 times
 : 6 times
 : 5 times
 : twice
 : twice
 : twice
 : once
 : once
 : once
 : once
 : once
 : once
 : once
 : once
 : once
 : once

Folk contest
Between 1974 and 1980 this contest was cancelled by the military dictatorship of Augusto Pinochet.Before 2000, the contest only allowed Chilean composers.In 2009, the contest included the former winners between 2001 and 2008.

Winning countries (since 2001, start of International Folk Contest)
 : 11 times (and 33 years of National Folk Contest, between 1961-1973 and 1981–2000)
 : 5 times
 : 3 times
 : once
 : once

Performing Artists

Every year international artists are invited to perform at the Festival. in the 2003 edition the Italian singer-songwriter Franco Simone received the "Lifetime Achievement Award" for having strung together thirty years of success in South America with his songs translated into Spanish,

Festival Queen
Every year the festival selects a queen. Popular personalities apply to be queen, often offering outrageous stunts to win.

The queen is chosen by a vote organized by the newspaper La Cuarta. Journalists accredited to the Festival express their preferences through a secret ballot.

The day after the election there is a coronation and the delivery of a band and a ring as a prize by the relevant authorities. Since 2001, on the day of the coronation the Queen of the Festival has to dive into the pool at the Hotel O'Higgins in Viña del Mar in front of the media.

Some of the women chosen as Queen include: Celia Cruz, Diana Bolocco, Thalía, Sigrid Alegría, Yuri, Raffaella Carrà, Tonka Tomicic, and Gloria Trevi.

In February 2023, the definitive elimination of the Reina de Viña was announced (assuming the election of the Rey would never take place), before the refusal of the municipality headed by the mayor Macarena Ripamonti, due to the «stigmatization of the woman» and the farandulización of the event. In this way, the Reyes de Viña will be replaced by the «Festival Ambassadors», which will be elected by the general public and the press accredited in the place, in addition to having the purpose of returning to the tradition of awarding the official artists of the Festival and generate awareness about issues that contribute to society.

List of Queens

Notas

Queens per country

See also
List of historic rock festivals
List of music festivals in Chile

References

External links

 Viña del Mar city website (in Spanish)

 
Vina Del Mar International Song Festival, 2010
Music festivals established in 1960
Music festivals in Chile
Pop music festivals
Recurring events established in 1960
Rock festivals in Chile
Song contests
Tourist attractions in Valparaíso Region
Summer events in Chile